The flag of Hawaii, in addition to the current state design, previously had been used by the kingdom, protectorate, republic, and territory of Hawaii. It is the only U.S. state flag to include a foreign country's national flag. The inclusion of the Union Jack of the United Kingdom is a mark of the Royal Navy's  historical relations with the Hawaiian Kingdom, particularly with King Kamehameha I. The flag continued to be used after the 1893 overthrow of the Hawaiian Kingdom.

Background

In 1793, Captain George Vancouver, of the British Royal Navy, having previously visited the islands in 1778–1779 with Captain James Cook, returned in command of HMS Discovery. During the visit, Vancouver met with Kamehameha I and presented him with a Red Ensign, used by the Royal Navy at the time. The Kingdom of Ireland was not a formal part of the United Kingdom before 1801, which meant that, at this time, the British flag did not contain the Saint Patrick's Cross of Ireland. This version of the Red Ensign, as well as the current version which added the cross in 1801, served as the unofficial flag of the Kingdom of Hawaii until 1816.

Scottish Captain Alexander Adams' journals mention the British East India Company flag when Kamehameha had originally purchased Adams' brig named the Forester and renamed . As part of the ship's transfer, the ensign of the East India Company, which consisted of the Union Jack on a field of red-and-white stripes, was taken by Adams during a ceremony with an 11-gun salute. Many older Native Hawaiians prior to 1921 believed that the current flag of Hawaii was created by Adams during his trip to China in 1817. At that time Adams was Commander of the Hawaiian Kingdom Navy, captaining the  under Kamehameha I. While there is no indication that the flag was either made or flown during that period, Adams did note that on his way to China, while stopping at Waimea, Kauai for supplies, he did give Kaumualiʻi his own ensign to raise at the port, as the king only had a Russian flag left from the Russian colony in Hawaii.

There may have been different versions of the flag with different numbers of stripes and colors. The number of stripes also changed: originally, the flag was designed with either seven or nine horizontal stripes, and in 1845 it was officially changed to eight stripes. The latter arrangement is used today.

Design

The canton of the flag of Hawaii contains the Union Flag of the United Kingdom, prominent over the top quarter closest to the flag mast. The field of the flag is composed of eight horizontal stripes, symbolizing the eight major islands (Hawaii, Maui, Kahoolawe, Lānai, Molokai, Oahu, Kauai, and Niihau). Other versions of the flag have only seven stripes, probably representing the islands with the exception of Kahoolawe or Niihau. The color of the stripes, from the top down, follows the sequence: white, red, blue, white, red, blue, white, red. The colors were standardized in 1843, although other combinations have been seen and are occasionally still used.

In 2001, a survey conducted by the North American Vexillological Association (NAVA) placed Hawaii's flag 11th in design quality out of the 72 U.S. and Canadian provincial, state, and territorial flags ranked.

Despite superficially resembling the flags of British Overseas Territories, the Hawaiian flag is proportioned differently – the Union Jack in the canton is in a 4:7 ratio, and a differing standard is used to define the colors.

In 1990, Governor of Hawaii John Waihee proclaimed July 31 to be , the Hawaiian Flag Day. It has been celebrated each year since then.

Flag of the Governor 

The flag used by the governor of Hawaii is a red and blue bi-color. In the middle of the eight white stars appears the name of the state in all capital letters. During the time Hawaii was a United States territory, the letters in the middle of the flag were "TH", which stood for "Territory of Hawaii".

Chronology
{| class="wikitable"
|-
! Date
! Flag
! Image
|-
|1793–1800
|British Red Ensign
| style="text-align:center;"|
|-
|1801–1816
|British Red Ensign following the Acts of Union with Ireland
| style="text-align:center;"|
|-
|1816–1845
|Early version of the present flag (1:2 canton)
| style="text-align:center;"|
|-
|February 1843 – July 1843
|Union Flag (during the Paulet Affair)
| style="text-align:center;"|
|-
|1845–1898
|The current Hawaiian flag introduced in 1845 (4:7 canton)
| style="text-align:center;"|
|-
|February 1893 – April 1893
|US flag (after the overthrow of the Kingdom of Hawaii)
| style="text-align:center;"|
|-
|1898–present
|Hawaiian flag used by the US territory and state of Hawaii
| style="text-align:center;"|
|}

flag 

The  ('true people' in the Hawaiian language) design is purported by some to be the original flag of the Kingdom of Hawaiʻi, though this claim is unverified and widely disputed.

Gene Simeona claims to have unearthed the Kanaka Maoli flag in 1999. Simeona said he encountered a descendant of Lord George Paulet who told him about an earlier flag. Simeona claims to have found evidence of the  flag in the state archives, though any sources he may have used have not been identified. Subsequent efforts to verify Simeona's claim have been unsuccessful. Critics of the claim have pointed to evidence of the widely accepted Hawaiian flag being in existence before the Kanaka Maoli flag. Louis "Buzzy" Agard had proposed a Hawaiian flag design in 1993 which featured nine alternating stripes and the same charge as on the  flag, leading many to believe it is where Simeona drew his inspiration.

Despite the lack of verification about its historic use, the design has gained popularity among people who prefer its lack of colonial imagery.

Gallery

See also

 Grand Union Flag
 Flag of New England
 George Rex Flag
 List of Hawaii state symbols
 Seal of Hawaii

References

External links

 Constitutional Provisions for the Display of Ka Hae Hawaii
 

Symbols of Hawaii
Hawaii
1845 establishments in Hawaii
1898 establishments in Hawaii
Hawaii
Hawaii
Flags introduced in 1898